In molecular biology, the FEZ-like protein family is a family of eukaryotic proteins thought to be involved in axonal outgrowth and fasciculation. The N-terminal regions of these sequences are less conserved than the C-terminal regions, and are highly acidic. The Caenorhabditis elegans homologue, UNC-76, may play structural and signalling roles in the control of axonal extension and adhesion (particularly in the presence of adjacent neuronal cells) and these roles have also been postulated for other FEZ family proteins. Certain homologues have been definitively found to interact with the N-terminal variable region (V1) of PKC-zeta, and this interaction causes cytoplasmic translocation of the FEZ family protein in mammalian neuronal cells. The C-terminal region probably participates in the association with the regulatory domain of PKC-zeta. The members of this family are predicted to form coiled-coil structures which may interact with members of the RhoA family of signalling proteins, but are not thought to contain other characteristic protein motifs. Certain members of this family are expressed almost exclusively in the brain, whereas others (such as FEZ2) are expressed in other tissues, and are thought to perform similar but unknown functions in these tissues.

References

Protein families